Delitto al Blue Gay, internationally released as Cop in Drag, is a 1984 Italian "poliziottesco"-comedy film directed by Bruno Corbucci. It is the eleventh and final chapter in the Nico Giraldi film series starred by Tomas Milian.

Plot 
Rome, Italy early 1980s. A man who worked at the Blue Gay, a transvestite cabaret, is found murdered, strangled. Marshal Nico Giraldi (Tomas Milian) is responsible for investigating the death by infiltrating in the Roman Gay community.

Cast 
Tomas Milian as Nico Giraldi
Bombolo as  Venticello
Olimpia Di Nardo as Angela
Vinicio Diamanti as Colomba Lamar 
 as Brigitte
 as Kurt Linder 
Marina Hedman as The Bait
Enzo Garinei as The Judge

See also 
 List of Italian films of 1984

References

External links
 
 

1984 films
1980s crime comedy films
Italian crime comedy films
Italian LGBT-related films
Poliziotteschi films
West German films
Films directed by Bruno Corbucci
Films scored by Fabio Frizzi
Films set in Berlin
Films set in Rome
Cross-dressing in film
1984 comedy films
1980s Italian-language films
1980s Italian films